Kim Won-Seop (Hangul: 김원섭; Hanja: 金元燮; born December 18, 1978) is a former outfielder in the KBO League.

References 

Kia Tigers players
Doosan Bears players
KBO League left fielders
1978 births
Living people
South Korean baseball players